Karan Brar (born January 18, 1999) is an  American actor. He portrayed Chirag Gupta in the Diary of a Wimpy Kid film franchise and Ravi Ross on the Disney Channel Original Series Jessie and its subsequent spin-off Bunk'd.

Early life
Karan Brar was born on January 18, 1999, in Redmond, Washington, to parents who are of Indian ancestry. He was raised in Bothell, Washington, and has one older sibling, a sister named Sabreena.  Brar attended Cedar Wood Elementary School and studied acting at John Robert Powers and Patti Kalles workshops.

Career
Brar began his acting career at the age of 11, starring as Indian middle schooler Chirag Gupta in the comedy feature film Diary of a Wimpy Kid.  Brar naturally speaks with an American accent and worked with a dialect coach to perfect his Indian accent for the role.

In March 2011, Brar reprised his role as Chirag Gupta in the feature film sequel Diary of a Wimpy Kid: Rodrick Rules. In October 2011, it was confirmed that he would also be reprising his role as Chirag for the third installment of the Wimpy Kid franchise, Diary of a Wimpy Kid: Dog Days, released on August 3, 2012.  In April 2010, he appeared in the Seeds of Compassion advertorial campaign announcing the Dalai Lama's visit to Seattle, as well as appearing in commercials for Shell Gasoline and Committee for Children.

Brar began starring in the role of 10-year-old Indian adoptee Ravi Ross on the Disney Channel comedy series Jessie in September 2011.  During pre-production of the show, the role of Ravi was originally intended to be a Hispanic boy named Javier from South America, but casting directors were impressed with Brar during the audition process and ultimately decided to recreate the role for him.

In February 2015, a new Disney Channel series Bunk'd, a spin-off of Jessie, was announced, in which Brar would reprise his role as Ravi Ross. That year, he played the role of George in the Disney Channel Original Movie Invisible Sister. In 2018, he had a minor role in the science fiction film Pacific Rim Uprising.

Personal life
Brar lived in the Los Angeles area with his parents and older sister, until he moved in with fellow actors Cameron Boyce and Sophie Reynolds in May 2019.

Filmography

Film

Television

Podcast

Awards and nominations

References

External links
 

1999 births
21st-century American male actors
Male actors from Washington (state)
American male child actors
American male film actors
American male actors of Indian descent
American male television actors
Living people
People from Bothell, Washington
People from Redmond, Washington